Waldemar Schreckenberger (12 November 1929 – 4 August 2017) was a German lawyer, professor emeritus, and  politician born in Ludwigshafen. After his graduation from Heidelberg Law School, he earned a doctorate, and completed his habilitation at the German University of Administrative Sciences Speyer. Subsequently, he assumed full professorships of public law and legal philosophy at the University of Mainz and at Speyer. From 1981 to 1982, he served as Minister of Justice of Rhineland Palatinate and thereafter as Chancellery Chief of Staff under Chancellor Helmut Kohl.

He died on 4 August 2017 at the age of 87.

References

1929 births
2017 deaths
German legal scholars
Heads of the German Chancellery
People from Ludwigshafen
Heidelberg University alumni
Academic staff of Johannes Gutenberg University Mainz